List of settlements in Sussex by population may refer to:

List of settlements in East Sussex by population
List of settlements in West Sussex by population